Daniela Andrea Guajardo Cornejo (born 23 June 1990) is a Chilean road and track cyclist.

Major results

2008
 1st  Road race, National Junior Road Championships
 2nd  Team sprint, Pan American Track Championships
2012
 Pan American Track Championships
2nd  Scratch
3rd  Points race
2014
 1st  Time trial, National Road Championships
 Copa Internacional de Pista
1st Points race
3rd Individual pursuit
 3rd  Scratch, Pan American Track Championships
 10th Time trial, Pan American Road Championships
2015
 1st  Time trial, National Road Championships
 3rd  Team pursuit, Pan American Track Championships (with Denisse Ahumada, Valentina Monsalve Giraudo and Flor Palma)
 3rd Copa Federación Venezolana de Ciclismo
2017
 3rd  Team pursuit, Bolivarian Games
2021
 3rd  Team pursuit, Pan American Track Championships

References

External links

Chilean female cyclists
Living people
Cyclists at the 2011 Pan American Games
Cyclists at the 2015 Pan American Games
1985 births
Pan American Games competitors for Chile
People from Curicó
21st-century Chilean women